Euphyes vestris, the dun skipper, sedge witch or dun sedge skipper, is a species of butterfly of the family Hesperiidae. It is found in North America from Nova Scotia west across southern Canada to southern Alberta, south to Florida, the Gulf Coast and eastern Texas. There are disjunct populations in the High Plains and Rocky Mountains and along the Pacific Coast.

The wingspan is 29–35 mm. Adults are on wing in July in one generation per year. They feed on the nectar from white, pink and purple flowers, including Asclepias syriaca, Vicia americana, Prunella, Mentha × piperita, Apocynum, Ceanothus americanus and Echium vulgare.

The larvae feed on various sedges, including Cyperus esculentus and Carex heliophila.

Subspecies
Euphyes vestris vestris (California)
Euphyes vestris metacomet (Harris, 1862) (from Alberta east through the southern parts of Saskatchewan, Manitoba, Ontario, Quebec and New Brunswick, southeast through Montana, South Dakota, Kansas, Missouri, Arkansas, Mississippi and Louisiana, and eastward to the Atlantic coast)
Euphyes vestris kiowah (Reakirt, 1866)
Euphyes vestris harbisoni Brown & McGuire, 1983 (California)

References

Hesperiini
Butterflies described in 1852